Pillsbury State Park is a state park located mainly in Washington and partially in Goshen, New Hampshire, in the United States. It is home to the headwaters of the Ashuelot River. It contains one of the more rustic campgrounds in the state park system, with no electricity and limited running water.  There are 40 campsites, most of which are reservable. Eleven of the sites are at "remote" locations, most of which are accessible by canoe. Hiking trails connect to the  Monadnock-Sunapee Greenway trail.

References

External links
Pillsbury State Park New Hampshire Department of Natural and Cultural Resources
Pillsbury State Park Trail Map New Hampshire Department of Natural and Cultural Resources

State parks of New Hampshire
Parks in Sullivan County, New Hampshire
Washington, New Hampshire
Goshen, New Hampshire